This article lists the classical guitar music in the classical guitar repertoire. It includes baroque guitar and vihuela music, but not lute music. This music is most commonly performed by classical guitarists and requires the use of a variety of classical guitar techniques to play.

During the Renaissance, the guitar was likely to have been used as it frequently is today in popular music, that is to provide strummed accompaniment for a singer or a small group. There also were several significant music collections published during the 16th century of contrapuntal compositions approaching the complexity, sophistication and breadth of lute music from the same period. Most Renaissance lute music has been transcribed for guitar (see List of composers for lute).

The baroque guitar (c.1600–1750) was a string instrument with five courses of gut strings and moveable gut frets. The first (highest pitched) course was sometimes a single string. It replaced the Renaissance lute as the most common instrument found in the home.

The romantic guitar, in use from approximately 1790 to 1830, was the guitar of the Classical and Romantic period of music, showing remarkable consistency in the instrument's construction during these decades. By this time guitars used six, sometimes more, single strings instead of courses. The romantic guitar eventually led to a different type of guitar in Spain: the fan-braced Spanish guitars of Torres, which may be seen as the immediate precursor of the modern classical guitar.

In the 20th century, many non-guitarist composers wrote for the instrument, whereas previously only players of the instrument had done so.

16th century 
1535-36 Luis de Milán (c.1500–after 1561) Libro de musica de vihuela de mano intitulado El Maestro
1538 Luis de Narváez (1510–1555) Los seis libros del Delphin de música de cifra para tañer vihuela
1546 Alonso Mudarra (c.1508–1580) Tres libros de música
1547 Enríquez de Valderrábano (1500–1557) Libro de música
1547 Enríquez de Valderrábano (1500–1557) Silva de sirenas
1551 Adrian Le Roy (1520–1598) Premier livre de tablature de guiterre
1552 Diego Pisador (1509–1557) Libro de Música de Vihuela
1553 Grégoire Brayssing (fl. 16th century) Quart livre de tablature de guiterre
1554 Miguel de Fuenllana (?1500–1579) Orphénica lyra
1576 Esteban Daza (c.1537–1591) El Pamasso
c.1580 Girolamo Giuliani (fl. 1580) Intabulatura de Chitara

17th century 
1640 Giovanni Paolo Foscarini (fl. c.1621–c.1649) Li cinque libri della chitarra alla spagnola
1643 Francesco Corbetta (c.1615–1681) Varii capricii per la ghittara spagnuola
1646 Carlo Calvi (fl. 17th century) Intavolatura di chitarra, e chitarriglia
1650 Domenico Pellegrini (fl. 17th century) Soavi concenti di sonate musicali per la chitarra spagnuola
1659 Giovanni Battista Granata (c.1620–1687) Soavi concenti di sonate musicali per la chitarra spagnuola
1674 Gaspar Sanz (1640–1710) Instrucción de música sobre la guitarra española
1682 Robert de Visée (c.1650–1725) Livre di guittarre dédié au roy
1692 Ludovico Roncalli (1660?–1720?) Capricci armonici sopra la chitarra spagnola
1694 Francesc Guerau (1649–1722) Poema Harmónico

18th century 
1716 François Campion (1680–1748) Nouvelles découvertes sur la guitare
c.1730 Santiago de Murcia (1682–1735?) Codice Saldivar no. 4

19th century 
c.1802 Fernando Sor (1778–1839) Sonata op. 15
1807 Simon Molitor (1766–1848) Große Sonate op. 7
1809 Mauro Giuliani (1781–1829) Grande Ouverture op. 61
1810 Ferdinando Carulli (1770–1841) Method for the guitar op. 241
1821 Fernando Sor (1778–1839) Variations on a Theme of Mozart op. 9
1825 Dionisio Aguado y García (1784–1849) Trois Rondos brillants op. 2
1847 Johann Kaspar Mertz (1806–1856) Bardenklänge op. 13
c.1850 Johann Kaspar Mertz (1806–1856) Elegie
1851 Johann Dubez (1828–1891) Fantaisie sur des motifs hongrois
1853 Matteo Carcassi (1792–1853) 25 Studies op. 60
1899 Francisco Tárrega (1852–1909) Recuerdos de la Alhambra

20th century

1900s
?1906 Ottorino Respighi (1879–1936) Variazioni

1910s

1920s
1920 Manuel de Falla (1876–1946) Homenaje: Le Tombeau de Claude Debussy
1920 Heitor Villa-Lobos (1887–1959) Chôros No. 1
1921 Agustín Barrios (1885–1944) La Catedral
?1921 Henri Collet (1885–1951) Briviesca
1923 Carlos Chávez (1899–1978) Three Pieces
1923 Federico Moreno Torroba (1891–1982) Sonatina in A major
1923 Joaquín Turina (1882–1949) Sevillana, Op. 29
1925 Manuel Ponce (1882–1948) Sonata mexicana
1925 Joaquín Turina (1882–1949) Fandanguillo, Op. 36
1926 Pierre de Bréville (1861–1949) Fantaisie
1927 Manuel Ponce (1882–1948) Sonata No. 3
1927 Cyril Scott (1879–1970) Sonatina
1928 Manuel Ponce (1882–1948) Sonata clásica
1928 Heitor Villa-Lobos (1887–1959) Suite populaire brésilienne
1929 Manuel Ponce (1882–1948) Sonatina romántica
1929 Manuel Ponce (1882–1948) Variations and Fugue on 'La Folia de Espana' 
1929 Heitor Villa-Lobos (1887–1959) 12 Etudes

1930s
?1930 Óscar Esplá (1886–1976) Tempo di sonata
1931 Joaquín Turina (1882–1949) Sonata
1932 Manuel Ponce (1882–1948) Homenaje a Tárrega
1932 Joaquín Turina (1882–1949) Hommage à Tárrega, op. 69
1933 Antonio José Martínez Palacios (1902–1936) Sonata
1933 Frank Martin (1890–1974) Quatre Pièces Brèves
1935 Mario Castelnuovo-Tedesco (1895–1968) Sonata (Omaggio a Boccherini)
1939 Boris Asafyev (1884–1949) Prélude et valse
1939 Manuel Ponce (1882–1948) Sonatina meridional
1939 Joaquín Rodrigo (1901–1999) En los trigales

1940s
1940 Heitor Villa-Lobos (1887–1959) Five Preludes
1942 Jarmil Burghauser (1921–1997) Six Czech Dances
1942 Joaquín Rodrigo (1901–1999) Entre olivares
1943 Jarmil Burghauser (1921–1997) Sonata in E minor
1944 Marius Flothuis (1914–2001) Twee stukken, op. 22
1948 José Ardévol (1911–1981) Sonata
1949 Erik Bergman (1911–2006) Suite, op. 32

1950s
1950 Federico Moreno Tórroba (1891–1982) Sonata-Fantasia
1951 Heitor Villa-Lobos (1887–1959) Concerto for guitar and small orchestra
1952 Bruno Bartolozzi (1911–1980) Tre pezzi
1952 Lou Harrison (1917–2003) Serenado
1952 Alexandre Tansman (1896–1987) Cavatina
1953 Henri Gagnebin (1886–1977) Trois pièces
1954-5 Ettore Desderi (1892–1974) Sonata in mi
1955 Hans Erich Apostel (1901–1972) Sechs Musiken
1956 Reginald Smith Brindle (1917–2003) El Polifemo de Oro
1957 Lennox Berkeley (1903–1989) Sonatina, op. 52, no. 1
1957 Leo Brouwer (born 1939) Danza característica
1957 Roberto Gerhard (1896–1970) Fantasia: Interlude in Cantares
1957 Ernst Krenek (1900–1991) Suite
1957 Darius Milhaud (1892–1974) Segoviana, op. 366
1957 Maurice Ohana (1914–1992) Tiento
1957 Marilyn Ziffrin (born 1926) Rhapsody
1958 Camargo Guarnieri (1907–1993) Estudo nº1
1958 Hans Werner Henze (1926-2012) Drei Tentos
1958 Einojuhani Rautavaara (born 1928) Partita
1959 Tristram Cary (1925–2008) Sonata for Guitar Alone
1959 Giorgio Federico Ghedini (1892–1965) Studio da concerto
1959 Goffredo Petrassi (1904–2003) Suoni notturni
1959 Carlos Surinach (1915–1997) Sonatina

1960s
1960 Georges Auric (1899–1983) Hommage à Alonso Mudarra
1960 Francis Poulenc (1899–1963) Sarabande
1960 Joaquín Rodrigo (1901–1999) Sonata giocosa
1961 Henk Badings (1907–1987) 12 Preludes
1961 Cornelius Cardew (1936–1981) Piece (for Stella)
1961 Hans Haug (1900–1967) Prélude, tiento et toccata
1961 Gian Francesco Malipiero (1882–1973) Preludio
1961 Joaquín Rodrigo (1901–1999) Invocación y danza
1961 Rudolf Wagner-Régeny (1903–1969) Sonatine
1961 Thomas Wilson (1927–2001) Three Pieces
1962 Jean Absil (1893–1974) Dix pièces, op. 111
1962 Louis Andriessen (1939–2021) Triplum
1962 Girolamo Arrigo (born 1930) Serenata
1962 Leo Brouwer (born 1939) Danza del antiplano
1962 Leo Brouwer (born 1939) Tango
1963 Jean Absil (1893–1974) Suite, op. 114
1963 Benjamin Britten (1913–1976) Nocturnal after John Dowland, op. 70
1963 Stephen Dodgson (1924-2013) Partita
1963 Cristóbal Halffter (born 1930) Codex I
1963 André Jolivet (1905–1974) Deux études de concert
1963 Joaquín Rodrigo (1901–1999) Tres piezas españolas
1963-64 Maurice Ohana (1914–1992) Si le jour paraît...
1964 Jean Absil (1893–1974) Pièces caracteristiques, op. 123
1964 Leo Brouwer (born 1939) Elogio de la danza
1964 Federico Mompou (1893–1987) Suite compostelana
1965 Stephen Dodgson (1924-2013) with Hector Quine 20 Studies
1965 Alcidez Lanza (born 1929) modulos I
1965 Antonio Ruiz-Pipò (1934–1997) Cinqo Movimientos para la guitarra de diez cuerdas de Narciso Yepes
1967 Leonardo Balada (born 1933) Analogías
1967 Gottfried von Einem (1918–1996) Drei Studien, op. 34
?1968 Richard Arnell (1917–2009) Six Pieces
1968 Mason Williams (born 1938) Classical Gas
1968 Richard Rodney Bennett (1936-2012) Impromptus
1968 Leo Brouwer (born 1939) Canticum
1968 Jarmil Burghauser (1921–1997) Sarabanda e toccata
1968 John W. Duarte (1919–2004) English Suite
1968 Tom Eastwood (1922–1999) Ballade-Phantasy
1968 John McCabe (born 1939) Canto
1968 Josep Mestres-Quadreny (born 1929) Perludi
1968 Leon Schidlowsky (born 1931) Interludio
1969 David Bedford (born 1937) You Asked For It
1969 Stephen Dodgson (1924-2013) Fantasy-Divisions
1969 Peter Racine Fricker (1920–1990) Paseo
1969 Elisabeth Lutyens (1906–1983) The Dying of the Sun

1970s

1970
1970 Jean Absil (1893–1974) Sur un paravent chinois, op. 147
1970 Jean Absil (1893–1974) Quatre pièces, op. 150
1970 Jean Absil (1893–1974) Petit bestiaire, op. 151
1970 Denis ApIvor (1916–2004) Discanti, op. 48
1970 Vicente Asencio (1908–1979) Collectici íntim
1970 Lennox Berkeley (1903–1989) Theme and Variations
1970 Jarmil Burghauser (1921–1997) Tesknice: Canti dell'Ansietà
1970 Tom Eastwood (1922–1999) Amphora
1970 Ferenc Farkas (1905–2000) Six pièces brèves
1970 Joseph Horovitz (born 1926) Ghetto Song
1970 Armin Kaufmann (1902–1980) Rhapsodie
1970 François Morel (born 1926) Me duele españa
1970 Reginald Smith Brindle (1917–2003) Variants on Two Themes of J. S. Bach

1971
1971 Malcolm Arnold (1921–2006) Fantasy, Op. 107
1971 Leo Brouwer (born 1939) La espiral eterna
1971 David Farquhar (1928–2007) Five Scenes
1971 Harrison Kerr (1897–1978) Variations on a Theme from "The Tower of Kel"
1971 Bruno Maderna (1920–1973) Y después
1971 Alan Rawsthorne (1905–1971) Elegy
1971 Guido Santórsola (1904–1994) Sonata No. 2 "Hispanica"
1971 William Walton (1902–1983) Five Bagatelles

1972
1972 Jean Absil (1893–1974) Douze pièces, op. 159
1972 Denis ApIvor (1916–2004) Saeta, op. 53
1972 Luciano Chailly (1920–2002) Invenzione su quattro note
1972 Peter Maxwell Davies (1934–2016) Lullaby for Illian Rainbow
1972 André Jolivet (1905–1974) Tombeau de Robert de Visée
1972 Giles Swayne (born 1946) Canto
1972 Arthur Wills (born 1929) Sonata

1973
1973 Xavier Benguerel (born 1931) Versus
1973 Leo Brouwer (born 1939) Parabola
1973 Leo Brouwer (born 1939) Per suonare a duo
1973 Philippe Drogoz (born 1937) Prélude à la Mise à Mort
1973 Angelo Gilardino (born 1941) Tenebrae factae sunt
1973 Edward McGuire (born 1948) Music for Guitar(s)
1973 Per Nørgård (born 1932) Libra
1973 Poul Ruders (born 1949) Jargon
1973 Reginald Smith Brindle (1917–2003) Memento in Two Movements

1974
1974 William Bolcom (born 1938) Seasons
1974 Robert Beaser (born 1954) Canti Notturni
1974-6 Axel Borup-Jørgensen (born 1924) Praeambula, op. 72
1974 Leo Brouwer (born 1939) Tarantos
1974 Carlos Chávez (1899–1978) Feuille d'album
1974 Jindřich Feld (1925–2007) Barbaric Dance
1974 Jindřich Feld (1925–2007) Sonata
1974 Jorge Labrouve (born 1948) Nueva, op. 8
1974 Jorge Labrouve (born 1948) Enigma, op. 9
1974 Humphrey Searle (1915–1982) Five, op. 61
1974 Reginald Smith Brindle (1917–2003) Do Not Go Gentle...
1974 Reginald Smith Brindle (1917–2003) November Memories
1974 Richard Stoker (1938–2021) Sonatina, op. 42
1974 Toru Takemitsu (1930–1996) Folios

1975
1975 José Ramón Encinar (born 1954) El aire de saber cerrar los ojos
1975 Hans Gefors (born 1952) La boîte chinoise, op. 12:1
1975 Anthony Hedges (1931-2019) Three Fancies
1975 Jean-Paul Holstein (born 1939) Du futur... à... l'au-delà
1975 Reginald Smith Brindle (1917–2003) Four Poems of García Lorca
1975 Michael Blake Watkins (born 1948) Solus
1975 Flemming Weis (1898–1981) Aspects

1976
1976 Jorge de Freitas Antunes (born 1942) Sighs
1976 Walter Boudreau, CM CQ (1947)  Le Cercle gnostique
1976 Stephen Dodgson (1924-2013) Partita No. 2
1976 Michael Finnissy (born 1946) Song 17
1976 Alberto Ginastera (1916–1983) Sonata for guitar (1976)
1976-9 Hans Werner Henze (1926–2012) Royal Winter Music I
1976 Per Nørgård (born 1932) Returns
1976 Ib Nørholm (born 1931) Sonata No. 1, Op. 69
1976 Poul Rovsing-Olsen (1922–1982) Nostalgie, op. 78
1976 Reginald Smith Brindle (1917–2003) Sonata No. 2 "El Verbo"
1976 Giles Swayne (born 1946) Suite
1976 Claude Vivier (1948 – 1983) Pour Guitare

1977
1977 William Albright (1944–1998) Shadows: Eight Serenades
1977 Theodore Antoniou (born 1935) Stichomythia II
1977 Vytautas Barkauskas (born 1931) Suite B
1977 Bruno Bartolozzi (1911–1980) Adles
1977 Erik Bergman (1911–2006) Midnight, op. 83
1977 Gilbert Biberian (born 1944) Sonata No. 3
1977 William Bland (born 1947) A Fantasy-Homage to Tomás Luis de Victoria
1977 Stephen Dodgson (1924-2013) Legend
1977 Franco Donatoni (1927–2000) Algo
1977 Denis Dufour (born 1953) Boucles, op. 5
1977 Tom Eastwood (1922–1999) Romance et plainte
1977 Oliver Hunt (1934–2000) Garuda - Ballade
1977 Douglas Jamieson (born 1949) Elegy
1977 Elisabeth Lutyens (1906–1983) Romanza
1977 Einojuhani Rautavaara (born 1928) Serenades of the Unicorn
1977 José Peris (born 1924) Elegía para Gisela
1977 Michèle Reverdy (born 1943) Number One
1977 Tristan Murail (born 1947) Tellur
1977 Thomas Wilson (1927–2001) Canción

1978
1978 Violet Archer (1913–2000) Fantasy on 'Blanche comme le neige' 
1978 Gunnar Berg (1909–1989) Fresques
1978 Dušan Bogdanović (born 1955) Sonata No. 1
1978 Stephen Dodgson (1924-2013) Merlin
1978 Jean Françaix (1912–1997) Serenata
1978 Lou Harrison (1917–2003) Plaint and Variations on Walter von der Vogelweide's "Song of Palestine"
1978 Lou Harrison (1917–2003) Serenade
1978 Nestor de Hollanda Cavalcanti (born 1949) Suite Quadrada
1978 Per Nørgård (born 1932) In Memory of...
1978 Reginald Smith Brindle (1917–2003) Sonata No. 3 "The Valley of Esdralon"
1978 Reginald Smith Brindle (1917–2003) Sonata No. 4 "La Breve"
1978 Michael Blake Watkins (born 1948) The Spirit of the Earth

1979
1979 John Addison (1920–1998) Illyrian Lullaby
1979 Gustavo Becerra-Schmidt (born 1925) Third Sonata
1979 Judith Bingham (born 1952) Moonrise
1979 Edward Cowie (born 1943) Commedia Lazis
1979 David Del Tredici (born 1937) Acrostic Song (Final Alice)
1979 Petr Eben (1929–2007) Mare Nigrum
1979 Ferenc Farkas (1905–2000) Sonata
1979 Vagn Holmboe (1909–1996) Sonata No. 1, Op. 141
1979 Vagn Holmboe (1909–1996) Sonata No. 2, Op. 142
1979 Alan Hovhaness (1911–2000) Sonata No. 1
1979 Alan Hovhaness (1911–2000) Sonata No. 2
1979 Wilfred Josephs (1927–1997) Thoughts on a Spanish Guitar, Op. 111
1979 Stephen Oliver (1950–1992) Sonata
1979 Kenneth Platts (1946–1989) Sonatina
1979 Reginald Smith Brindle (1917–2003) Sonata No. 5
1979 Richard Stoker (born 1938) Pieces for Polita, Op. 57
1979 Hans Werner Henze (1926-2012) Royal Winter Music II
1979 Dang Ngoc Long (born 1957) "The Central Highlands of Tay Nguyen"

1980s

1980
1980 Denis ApIvor (1916–2004) Serenade, Op. 69
1980 Aldo Clementi (1925–2011) Dodici variazioni
1980 Dror Feiler (born 1951) Aria
1980 Barbara Kolb (born 1939) Three Lullabies
1980 Nikita Koshkin (born 1956) The Prince's Toys
1980 Einojuhani Rautavaara (born 1928) Monologues of the Unicorn
1980 Robert Beaser (born 1954)  Notes on a Southern Sky
1980 Ned Rorem (1923–2022) Suite
1980 Reginald Smith Brindle (1917–2003) Preludes and Fantasies

1981
1981 Leo Brouwer (born 1939) El Decameron negro
1981 Leo Brouwer (born 1939) Preludios epigramáticos
1981 Marius Constant (born 1925) D'une élégie slave
1981 Peter Maxwell Davies (1934–2016) Hill Runes
1981 Edison Denisov (1929–1996) Sonata
1981 Stephen Dodgson (1924-2013) Partita No. 3
1981 Petr Eben (1929–2007) Tabulatura Nova
1981 Vagn Holmboe (1909–1996) Five Intermezzi, op. 149
1981 John Anthony Lennon (born 1950) Another's Fandango
1981 Edward McGuire (born 1948) Prelude No. 5
1981-2 Bayan Northcott (born 1940) Fantasia

1982
1982 Denis ApIvor (1916–2004) Five Pieces, Op. 72a
1982 Denis ApIvor (1916–2004) Five Pieces, Op. 72b
1982 Xavier Benguerel (born 1931) Cantus
1982 Michael Berkeley (born 1948) Sonata in One Movement
1982 Robert Boelen (born 1949) Interlude in Em
1982 Amaury du Closel (born 1956) Cadence
1982 Ferenc Farkas (1905–2000) Exercitium Tonale
1982 Michael Finnissy (born 1946) Nasiye
1982 Stanley Glasser (born 1926) Arbor
1982 Maurice Ohana (1914-1992) Cadran Lunaire*

1983
1983 Richard Rodney Bennett (1936-2012) Sonata
1983 Antonio Bibalo (born 1922) Study in Blue
1983 Michel-Georges Brégent (1948 - 1993) Sapho
1983 Elliott Carter (1908–2012) Changes
1983-9 Brian Ferneyhough (born 1943) Kurze Schatten II
1983 Michel Gonneville (born 1950) Le Sommeil, le Regard, le Choix
1983 François Morel (born 1926) Divergences
1983 Jean Papineau-Couture CC GOQ (1916–2000) Exploration
1983 Michael Tippett (1905–1998) The Blue Guitar

1984
1984 Denis ApIvor (1916–2004) Nocturne, Op. 78
1984 Milton Babbitt (1916–2011) Composition for Guitar
1984 Bruno Bettinelli (1913–2004) Tre pezzi
1984 Peter Maxwell Davies (1934–2016) Sonata
1984 Halim El-Dabh (1921-2017) Wedding Time
1984 Michael Jacques (born 1944) Three Humoresques (Hommage à Walton)
1984 Andrew Paul MacDonald (born 1958) Fantasy Sonata
1984 Richard Stoker (born 1938) Dance Movements, op. 66
1984 John Tavener (1944–2013) Chant
1984 Giulio Viozzi (1912–1984) Sonata

1985
1985 Radamés Gnattali (1906–1988) Petite Suite
1985 Samuel Adler (born 1928) Sonata
1985 Dušan Bogdanović (born 1955) Sonata No. 2
1985 Alfonso Casanova (born 1953) 4 Breverías
1985 Alfonso Casanova (born 1953) Preludio Digital
1985 Carlo Domeniconi (born 1947) Koyunbaba
1985 Dror Feiler (born 1951) Sun Shade
1985 Dang Ngoc Long (born 1957) "For Thay"
1985 Graciane Finzi (born 1945) Non si muove una foglia
1985 Angelo Gilardino (born 1941) Sonata No. 1 ("Omaggio ad Antonio Fontanesi")
1985 Piers Hellawell (born 1956) Improvise! Improvise!
1985 Per Nørgård (born 1932) Tales From a Hand I: In the Mood of Spades
1985 Henri Sauguet (1901–1989) Cadence

1986
1986 Sérgio Assad (born 1952) Aquarelle
1986 Leo Brouwer (born 1939) From Yesterday to Penny Lane (Lennon-McCartney)
1986 Leo Brouwer (born 1939) Paisaje cubano con campanas
1986 Luciano Chailly (1920–2002) Improvvisazione
1986 Sidney Corbett (born 1960) Arien IV: Solo Music for Guitar
1986 James Dillon (born 1950) Shrouded Mirrors
1986 Roland Dyens (born 1955) Libra Sonatine
1986 John Frandsen (born 1956) Nature Morte
1986 Angelo Gilardino (born 1941) Sonata No. 2 ("Hivern florit")
1986 Andrew Paul MacDonald (born 1958) A Dancing Sphere
1986 Concepción Lebrero (born 1937) Remembranza de Juan de la Cruz
1986 Mel Powell (1923–1998) Setting
1986 Gerhard Präsent (born 1957) Praeludium und Toccata 
1986 Roger Reynolds (born 1934) The Behaviour of Mirrors
1986 Giles Swayne (born 1946) Solo, op. 42
1986 Alois Bröder (born 1961) Erdferne

1987
1986 Leo Brouwer (born 1939) Toronto Guitar Concerto No. 4
1987 Dao (born 1940) Nam aï
1987 Bent Lorentzen (born 1935) Umbra
1987 Robert Saxton (born 1953) Night Dance
1987 R. Murray Schafer (1933–2021) Le Cri de Merlin
1987 Jacques Hétu (1938–2010) Suite, Op. 41

1988
1988 Luciano Berio (1925–2003) Sequenza XI
1988 Denis Dufour (born 1953) Grenouille écarlate, Op. 51
1988 Toru Takemitsu (1930–1996) All in Twilight

1989
1989 Miguel Angel Cherubito (born 1941) Suite Popular Argentina
1989 Peter Dickinson (born 1934) Five Explorations
1989 Stephen Dodgson (1924-2013) Partita No. 4
1989 Angelo Gilardino (born 1941) Variazioni sulla Follìa
1989 Eduardo Martin (born 1956) Canciones del Calendario
1989 Eduardo Martin (born 1956) Pasajero en el tiempo
1989 Nicholas Maw (1935-2009) Music of Memory
1989 Per Nørgård (born 1932) Tales From a Hand III: Clubs among Jokers
1989 R. Murray Schafer (born 1933) Guitar Concerto

1990s

1990
1990 Leo Brouwer (born 1939) Sonata
1990 Dror Feiler (born 1951) Fire, Walk With Me
1990 Romuald Grinblat (1930–1995) Intermezzo
1990 David Hönigsberg (1959-2005) African Sonata (rev. 2004)
1990 Grigoriy Korchmar (born 1947) White Nights Serenades
1990 Ester Mägi (1922–2021) Valse con variazione
1990 Ursula Mamlok (born 1928) Five Intermezzi
1990 Tage Nielsen (born 1929) The Frosty Silence in the Gardens
1990 Pēteris Vasks (born 1946) Sonata of Loneliness
1990 Graham Whettam (1927–2007) Guitar Partita (original version 1968)

1991
1991 Michel-Georges Brégent (1948 - 1993) Concierto Flamenco
1991 Chris Dench (born 1953) Severance
1991 Anders Eliasson (born 1947) Untitled
1991 Christopher Fox (born 1955) Chile
1991 Angelo Gilardino (born 1941) Musica per l'angelo della Melancholìa
1991 Veli-Matti Puumala (born 1965) Hailin' Drams
1991 Jeanne Zaidel-Rudolph (born 1948) Five African Sketches

1992
1992 Daniel Asia (born 1953) Your Cry Will Be A Whisper
1992 Sinan Savaskan (born 1954) O Vos omnes Op.27 - Gesualdo premonitions
1986 Leo Brouwer (born 1939) Helsinki guitarconcert no.5

1993
1993 Robert Boelen (born 1949) Interlude in G
1993 Leo Brouwer (born 1939) Rito de los Orishas
1993 Ferenc Farkas (1905–2000) Tiento
1993 Dror Feiler (born 1951) We Are A Bomb
1993 Claudio Galante (born 1960) Deux esquisses
1993 Robert Keeley (born 1960) Two Ways of Looking at a Spider
1993 Arne Löthman (born 1954) Diptych
1993 Eduardo Martin (born 1956) Album de la Inocencia
1993 Terry Riley (born 1935) Ascención
1993 Toru Takemitsu (1930–1996) Equinox
1993 Param Vir (born 1952) Clear Light, Magic Body

1994
1994 Franghiz Ali-Zadeh (born 1947) Phantasie
1994 Mary Jeanne van Appledorn (born 1927) Postcards to John
1994 Xavier Benguerel (born 1931) Preludio indefinido
1994 Poul Ruders (born 1949) Etude and Ricercare
1994 Reginald Smith Brindle (1917–2003) The Prince of Venosa
1994 Charles Wuorinen (1938–2020) Guitar Variations

1995
1995 Howard Blake (born 1938) Prelude, Sarabande and Gigue
1995 T. E. Fleming Solis-Prim
1995 Aaron Jay Kernis (born 1960) Partita
1995 Gordon McPherson (born 1965) Uncanny Valley
1995 Thea Musgrave (born 1928) Postcards from Spain
1995 Per Nørgård (born 1932) Tales From a Hand II: The Queen of Hearts
1995 Terry Riley (born 1935) Barabas
1995 Pascale Criton (born 1954) La Ritournelle et le galop

1996
1996 Leo Brouwer (born 1939) Hika: In Memoriam Toru Takemitsu
1996 Martin Derungs (born 1943) Elegie, op. 59
1996 René Eespere (born 1953) Evocatio
1996 Bryn Harrison (born 1969) Forms of Distance
1996 John Anthony Lennon (born 1950) Gigolo
1996 John Anthony Lennon (born 1950) Sonatina
1996 John Anthony Lennon (born 1950) Thirteen
1996 Ester Mägi (1922–2021) 3 Miniatuuri
1996 Eduardo Martin (born 1956) Preludio, Son y Allegro
1996 Toru Takemitsu (1930–1996) In the Woods
1996 Richard Wernick (born 1934) Da'ase

1997
1997 Joanna Bailie (born 1973) Primary Interpolations
1997 Chris Dench (born 1953) Asymptotic Freedom
1997 Robert Beaser (born 1954) Shenandoah
1997 Elliott Carter (1908–2012) Shard
1997 James Erber (born 1951) Am Grabe Memphis Minnies
1997 Deirdre Gribbin (born 1967) The Sanctity of Trees
1997 Sam Hayden (born 1968) AXE(S)
1997 Paul Lansky (born 1944) Semi-Suite
1997 Mario Lavista (born 1943) Natarayah
1997 Jyrki Linjama (born 1962) Sonaatti
1997 Poul Ruders (born 1949) Chaconne
1997 Hirokazu Sato (born 1966) Mountains, Wind and the Lake

1998
1998 Niels Viggo Bentzon (1919–2000) Strumenta Diabolico, Op. 664
1998 Philip Cashian (born 1960) Talvi
1998 Mark Delpriora (born 1959) Sonata No. 3
1998 Ross Edwards (born 1943) Blackwattle Caprices
1998 Richard Emsley (born 1951) for guitar 1
1998 Bryn Harrison (born 1969) Fractured Spaces
1998 John Anthony Lennon (born 1950) The Fortunels
1998 Eduardo Martin (born 1956) Divertimentos Tropicales
1998 Per Nørgård (born 1932) Early Morn: Five Preludes and a Serenade
1998 Hannu Pohjannoro (born 1963) kuun kiertoa kohti

1999
1999 Simon Bainbridge (1952–2021) Dances for Moon Animals
1999 Sally Beamish (born 1956) Madrigal
1999 Erik Bergman (1911–2006) Extase, op. 143
1999 Leo Brouwer (born 1939) An Idea (Passacaglia for Eli)
1999 Leo Brouwer (born 1939) Paisaje cubano con tristeza
1999 Philip Cashian (born 1960) Black Venus
1999 René Eespere (born 1953) Staminis
1999 Philippe Fénelon (born 1952) Nocturnes
1999 Howard Skempton (born 1947) Five Preludes

2000
2000 Paul Clay (born 1977) Blink
2000 Gabriel Erkoreka (born 1969) Fantasia
2000 Graham Fitkin (born 1963) Skirting
2000 Mike Frengel (born 1972) And Then, Romina...
2000 Angelo Gilardino (born 1941) Winterzeit (after Robert Schumann)
2000 Michael Zev Gordon (born 1963) Bells, Lachrimae and Stillness
2000 Alwynne Pritchard (born 1968) Nostos ou Topos II
2000 Errollyn Wallen (born 1958) Three Ships

21st century

2001
2001 Jonathan Cole (born 1970) Suntrap
2001 Per Nørgård (born 1932) Tales From a Hand IV: Jack of Diamonds
2001 Alexander Shchetynsky (born 1960) Five Miniatures
2001-3 Howard Skempton (born 1947) Five Miniatures

2002

2002 Alois Bröder (born 1961) Fünf Verse
2002 René Eespere (born 1953) Motus
2002 Angelo Gilardino (born 1941) Colloquio con Andrés Segovia  	
2002 Angelo Gilardino (born 1941) Sonatine des fleurs et des oiseaux 	
2002 Angelo Gilardino (born 1941) Tríptico de las visiones 	
2002 Juho Kangas (born 1976) Fantasia
2002 Alastair King (born 1967) Three Dance Miniatures
2002 Karl-Wieland Kurz (born 1961) I giardini del sogno
2002 Eduardo Martin (born 1956) En Cinco Lineas

2003

2003 Angelo Gilardino (born 1941) Catskill Pond 	
2003 Angelo Gilardino (born 1941) La casa del faro 	
2003 John Anthony Lennon (born 1950) Concert Etudes
2003 Andrew Paul MacDonald (born 1958) Don Quixote, Knight of the Sad Countenance 	
2003 Joby Talbot (born 1971) Standing Wave
2003 Augusta Read Thomas (born 1964) Dialogs

2004

2004 Denis Dufour (born 1953) Rainette verte, op. 130
2004 René Eespere (born 1953) Evocatio
2004 Mike Frengel (born 1972) Slinky
2004 Angelo Gilardino (born 1941) Annunziazione (Omaggio al Beato Angelico) 	
2004 Angelo Gilardino (born 1941) Ikonostas (Omaggio a Pavel Florenskij
2004 Angelo Gilardino (born 1941) Memory of Antinous (Omaggio a Marguerite Yourcenar) 	
2004 Angelo Gilardino (born 1941) Sonata Mediterranea 	
2004 Angelo Gilardino (born 1941) Sonata del Guadalquivir 	
2004 Magnus Lindberg (born 1958) Mano a mano
2004 Olli Mustonen (born 1967) Jehkin Iivana (Sonata for Guitar)
2004 Kurt Schwertsik (born 1935) Ein kleines Requiem, op. 97

2005

2005 Aldo Clementi (1925–2011) F.A.C.
2005 Mark Delpriora (born 1959) Pocket Sonata
2005 Angelo Gilardino (born 1941) A Quiet Song (to the memory of John Duarte)
2005 José María Sánchez-Verdú (born 1968) Volaverunt

2006

2006 Dang Ngoc Long (born 1957) "Mienman"
2006 Joseph Atkins (born 1981) Indian Summer
2006 Gabriel Jackson (born 1962) Fantasia with Chorale (with bells)

2007

2007 Carlo Forlivesi (born 1971) En la soledat i el silenci
2007 Carlo Forlivesi (born 1971) Ugetsu
2007 Mark-Anthony Turnage (born 1960) Air with Variations

2008

2008 Martin Bresnick (born 1946) Joaquín is Dreaming (Joaquín Soñando)
2008 Bob Dickinson (born 1955) The Silence of Temples and Shrines
2008 Benjamin Dwyer (born 1965) Twelve Études
2008 Carlo Forlivesi (born 1971) Diferencias sobre el Finsterling
2008 Angelo Gilardino (born 1941) Sonata di Lagonegro
2008 Angelo Gilardino (born 1941) Winter Tales
2008 Paul Lansky (born 1944) Practical Preludes
2008 Poul Ruders (born 1949) Pages
2008 Steffen Schleiermacher (born 1960) Nadie nos ha visto (to Goya)
2008 Alexander Shchetynsky (born 1960) Meditation
2008 Dang Ngoc Long (born 1957) "Bamboo Ber"

2009

2009 Dušan Bogdanović (born 1955) Diptycha super nomen Paul Gerrits
2009 Dušan Bogdanović (born 1955) Fantasia: Hommage à Maurice Ohana
2009 Joe Cutler (born 1968) September Fragments
2009 Carlo Domeniconi (born 1947) Nam guitar solo
2009 Carlo Domeniconi (born 1947) Uzh i ya li moloda
2009 Máximo Diego Pujol (born 1957) El arte de la milonga

2010

2010 Dang Ngoc Long (born 1957) "Morning Mai"
2010 David Del Tredici (born 1937) Facts of Life
2010 Carlo Forlivesi (born 1971) Lachrimae Rerum
2010 Christopher Fox (born 1955) as air, as light
2010 Mike Frengel (born 1972) Hotbird
2010 Denis Gougeon (born 1951) Lamento-Scherzo
2010 Tiziano Manca (born 1970) Stur

2012

2012 Charlotte Bray (born 1982) Passing Shadows
2012 Sebastian Fagerlund (born 1972) Kromos
2012 Matthew Taylor (born 1964) Fantasy

2013

2013 Harrison Birtwistle (born 1934) Construction with Guitar
2013 Leo Brouwer (born 1939) Sonata No. 5: Ars Combinatoria

2022

2022 Francois Couture (born 1965) Sonate for 1 Guitar no1
2022 Francois Couture (born 1965) Sonate for 2 Guitars no1
2022 Francois Couture (born 1965) Sonate for 3 Guitars no1
2022 Francois Couture (born 1965) Sonate for 4 Guitars no1
2022 Francois Couture (born 1965) Sonate for 5 Guitars no1
2022 Francois Couture (born 1965) Sonate for 6 Guitars no1
2022 Francois Couture (born 1965) Sonate for 7 Guitars no1

References

 
Guitar